Lewis Bonaparte Bennett II (born August 4, 1963) is a former American football wide receiver in the National Football League who played for the New York Giants. He played college football for the Florida A&M Rattlers. He also played in the Arena Football League for the New York Knights.

In 1988, he was charged with murdering his wife.

References

1963 births
Living people
American football wide receivers
New York Giants players
New York Knights players
Florida A&M Rattlers football players
National Football League replacement players